Roméo Lavia (born 6 January 2004) is a Belgian professional footballer who plays as a defensive midfielder for Premier League club Southampton.

Club career

Anderlecht
Lavia is a youth product of the Belgian club Anderlecht. He arrived at eight years old at their training centre in Neerpede nearby Brussels.

At a local international youth tournament for players under the age of 15 he got noticed for the first time by Pep Guardiola. The Spanish trainer was there on invitation of his Manchester City player Kevin De Bruyne who is co-organiser of this tournament that also bears his name, the KDB Cup.

Manchester City
At the age of sixteen Lavia left Anderlecht in the summer of 2020 for Manchester City where he signed his first professional contract. He joined the U18 where he quickly stood out. In November that year after only eleven appearances he was already promoted to the U23. Together with the EDS team the Belgian youngster won the Premier League 2 championship in April 2021 and was voted player of the season.

Starting from the summer of 2021, Lavia started training with the first-team. He earned a selection into squad of the Citizens that played the 2021–22 UEFA Champions League. Roméo made his official first-team debut at 17 years old on 21 September 2021, at the third round of the 2021–22 EFL Cup against Wycombe Wanderers. He got a yellow card.

Southampton 
On 6 July 2022, Lavia joined Southampton and signed a five-year contract. On 6 August 2022, Lavia made his debut in a 4–1 loss away to Tottenham Hotspur. He scored his first goal on 30 August 2022 in the Saints' 2–1 win over Chelsea, becoming the first player born in 2004 to score in the Premier League.

International career
Born in Belgium, Lavia is of Ghanaian descent. In 2019, he played one official game for the Belgium U15 youth team and also one for the Belgium U16 in which he scored once. He has since played a lot of friendlies in which he is often team captain.

On 17 March 2023, he received his first call-up to the Belgian senior national team by manager Domenico Tedesco, for the UEFA Euro 2024 qualifying match against Sweden and the friendly against Germany.

Style of play
Lavia is a defensive midfielder. He stated that his inspirations are Barcelona player Sergio Busquets and his former Man City teammate Fernandinho. He visibly expressed himself to be comfortable when recovering the ball, making use of the intense pressing using intelligence, tenacity, along with pace, and when he makes line-breaking deep passes.

Career statistics

Honours
Manchester City U23
Professional Development League: 2020–21

References

External links
 

Living people
2004 births
Footballers from Brussels
Belgian footballers
Belgium youth international footballers
Black Belgian sportspeople
Belgian people of Ghanaian descent
Manchester City F.C. players
Southampton F.C. players
Premier League players
Association football midfielders
Belgian expatriate footballers
Belgian expatriate sportspeople in England
Expatriate footballers in England